Girya may refer to:
 Kettlebell
Olga Girya (born 1991), Russian chess player
 Girya, Iran, a village in Hamadan Province, Iran